Peter Mgangira (born 6 October 1980, in Lilongwe) is a Malawian footballer who currently plays for Blue Eagles FC. iN 2019 he was coaching at Silver Striker

International career
He plays for the Malawi national football team and is part of the 2010 African Cup of Nations.

References

1980 births
Living people
People from Lilongwe
Malawian footballers
Malawi international footballers
2010 Africa Cup of Nations players
Expatriate soccer players in South Africa
Jomo Cosmos F.C. players
Malawian expatriate sportspeople in South Africa
Malawian expatriate footballers
Silver Strikers FC players
Civo United FC players
Association football midfielders
Blue Eagles FC players